Si El Norte Fuera El Sur is the sixth studio album released on August 20, 1996 by Guatemalan singer-songwriter Ricardo Arjona.

Reception
The Allmusic review by Jason Birchmeier awarded the album 4.5 stars stating "All in all, it's Arjona's third classic album in a row, each distinct from its predecessor.".

Track listing
All tracks by Ricardo Arjona

 "Noticiero" (News Report) – 5:29
 "Tu Reputación" (Your Reputation) – 4:48
 "Ella y Él" (She And He) – 6:15
 "Se Nos Muere El Amor" (The Love is Dying on Us) – 4:07
 "Si El Norte Fuera El Sur" (If The North Was The South) – 4:55
 "Aún Te Amo (Carta No. 1)" (I Still Love You (Letter No.1) – 3:33
 "Abarrotería de Amor" (Grocery Store of Love) – 3:41
 "Duerme" (Sleep) – 5:03
 "Te Acuerdas de Mí (Carta No. 2, 20 Años Después)" (Do You Remember Me (Letter No. 2, 20 Years Later) – 4:17
 "Cita En El Bar" (Date at The Bar) – 4:23
 "Me Enseñaste" (You Taught Me) – 4:43
 "Frente al Televisor" (In Front of The T.V.) – 4:28
 "Tú" (You) – 4:28
 "México" – 4:27

Personnel 

 Patricia Aiken, Ronald Folsom, Yi Hu, Brian Leonard, Dennis Motchan, Bob Sanov, Francine Walsh, Elizabeth Wilson, Jennifer Woodward, Shari Zippert – violin
Ricardo Arjona – vocals, arranger, director, producer
 Phyllis Bailey, Francis Benítez, Gustavo, Patricia Hodges, Leyla Hoyle, Carlos Murguía, Kenny OBrian, Jesof Powel, Stephanie Spruitt – backing vocals
 Robbie Buchanan, Otmaro Ruíz – Piano
 Luis Conte – Percussion
 George Doering – acoustic guitar
 Assa Drori, Don Hahn – orchestration
 Laura Dvennen, Matt Funes, Andrew Picken, Kazi Pitelka – viola
 Pedro Eustache – flute
 Dennis Farias, Ramon Flores – trumpet
 Stefanie Fife, Roger Labow, Michael Mathews, Daniel Smith, Cecilia Tsan – cello
 Dan Higgins – clarinet, saxophone
 Abraham Laboriel, Sr. – bass
 Michael Landau – electric guitar
 Billy Preston – organ
 John "J.R." Robinson – drums
 David Stout – trombone
 Miguel Angel "Matin" Villagran – arranger, acoustic guitar

Technical personnel 

 Christina Abaroa – production coordination
 Bill – assistant engineer, mixing assistant
 Benny Faccone – engineer, mixing
 Bernie Grundman – mastering
 Rocio Larrazolo – art direction
 Leonardo Leos – wardrobe, make-up
 Mike Palm – assistant engineer
 Ricardo Trabulsi – Photography
 Rodolfo Vazquez – Engineer

Sales and certifications

References

External links
 http://www.ricardoarjona.com/

1996 albums
Ricardo Arjona albums
Sony Discos albums